"Don't Stop Movin'" is a song by British pop group S Club 7, released as a single on 23 April 2001. The song was written by the group, along with their regular songwriter Simon Ellis, together with Sheppard Solomon. Solomon had worked on hits in the 1990s by Eternal and Michelle Gayle. The song features lead vocals by Bradley McIntosh and has a disco style with violins and other stringed instruments. It was the lead single from S Club 7's third studio album, Sunshine (2001).

The song reached number one in the UK Singles Chart twice in the course of one month, with Geri Halliwell's "It's Raining Men" spending two weeks at the top position in between. The song's popularity rendered it the year's seventh biggest-selling single. It was also awarded the BRIT Award for Best British Single in 2002 and ITV's Record of the Year accolade. The song made it to number 3 in Q's "Guilty Pleasures" list in August 2006. It has sold 801,000 copies in the United Kingdom, as stated by the Official Charts Company.

Following the success of "Never Had a Dream Come True", S Club released "Don't Stop Movin'" as the lead single from their American-only album Don't Stop Movin'.

Music video

The official music video for the song was directed by Andy Morahan.

Track listings

 UK CD1
 "Don't Stop Movin'" – 3:53
 "Don't Stop Movin'" (Jewels & Stone radio mix) – 3:51
 "Right Guy" – 3:40
 "Don't Stop Movin'" (CD-ROM video) – 3:53

 UK CD2
 "Don't Stop Movin'" – 3:53
 "Reach" (karaoke version) – 4:05
 "Bring It All Back" (karaoke version) – 3:34

 UK cassette single
 "Don't Stop Movin'" – 3:53
 "Lately" – 4:32

 European CD single
 "Don't Stop Movin'" – 3:53
 "Don't Stop Movin'" (Jewels & Stone radio mix) – 3:51

 Australian CD single
 "Don't Stop Movin'" – 3:53
 "Don't Stop Movin'" (Pants 'N' Corset club) – 7:27
 "Don't Stop Movin'" (Trisco remix) – 7:31
 "Don't Stop Movin'" (CD-ROM video) – 3:53

Credits and personnel
Credits are lifted from the Sunshine album booklet.

Studio
 Mastered at Transfermation (London, England)

Personnel

 Simon Ellis – writing, keyboards, programming, production
 Sheppard Solomon – writing
 S Club 7 – writing
 Dave Rainger – guitar
 Ernie McKone – bass
 Gavyn Wright – concertmaster
 Nick Ingman – arrangement, conducting
 Isobel Griffiths – orchestral contracting
 Richard Robson – additional programming
 Chuck Norman – additional programming
 Stephen Lipson – additional programming, additional production
 Heff Moraes – mixing
 James Reynolds – engineering
 Richard Dowling – mastering

Charts

Weekly charts

Year-end charts

Decade-end charts

Certifications

Release history

Cover versions

On Ant & Dec's Saturday Night Takeaway, as part of Ant vs. Dec: The Teams, their challenge was to record a charity single. Ant's team sang this song as their single. They lost the challenge, however they still managed to chart at number 79 on the UK Singles Chart.

Starsailor covered this song on Radio 1's Live Lounge.

The song was also recorded by The Beautiful South for their cover album Golddiggas, Headnodders and Pholk Songs at a slower tempo in contrast to the original.

Boy band 911 sang the song on the ITV television programme Hit Me, Baby, One More Time.

Jo O'Meara recorded an "unplugged" acoustic version of the song in 2021 to mark 20 years since its original release.

References

19 Recordings singles
2001 singles
2001 songs
Brit Award for British Single
Disco songs
Irish Singles Chart number-one singles
Music videos directed by Andy Morahan
Number-one singles in Scotland
Number-one singles in Switzerland
Polydor Records singles
S Club 7 songs
Song recordings produced by Simon Ellis (record producer)
Songs about dancing
Songs written by Sheppard Solomon
Songs written by Simon Ellis (record producer)
UK Singles Chart number-one singles